Shahbaz Hamid Shigri (born 24 February 1988) is a Pakistani model, actor, director and producer. He has appeared in various films and is best known for playing the lead role of Hasan in Slackistan (2010) and a supporting role in Asim Raza's Parey Hut Love (2019).

He was nominated for the Best Music Video Director award at the 14th Lux Style Awards for directing the video for Adil Omar's "Exploding Heart".

Personal life 
Shigri started dating his Slackistan co-star, Aisha Linnea Akhtar, in May 2009, during the film's post-production phase. They married in March 2012, but divorced in June 2018.

In 2019, Shigri started dating singer Aima Baig. The couple got engaged in July 2021. In September 2022, Baig confirmed they had broken up on Instagram.

Filmography

Television

References

External links 
 

1988 births
Living people
Actors from Islamabad
Pakistani male models
Pakistani film directors